Basia A'Hern is a former Australian film, television, and stage actress. On stage, Basia has played the role of Little Cosette in the Sydney leg of the 1997–1999 Les Misérables Australasian Tour. A'Hern made her television debut in 2001, guesting as Cyntrina in the Farscape episode "...Different Destinations". She has also appeared as Rose Hall-Smith, Stevie Hall's daughter, on the popular Australian drama McLeod's Daughters. She also played the roles of Lyndz in Sleepover Club, Kate King in Don't Blame Me and Sasha in Double Trouble.  In 2002 A'Hern played Kate Henley in Disappearance, a film about a strange old ghost town. In 2008, she played Lucia Jones in the BBC-commissioned Australian soap opera Out of the Blue.

Filmography

External links

1989 births
Actors from Bristol
Australian child actresses
Australian television actresses
Australian stage actresses
Australian expatriates in England
English emigrants to Australia
Living people
21st-century Australian actresses